Final Battle (2017) was the 16th Final Battle professional wrestling pay-per-view (PPV) event produced by Ring of Honor (ROH). It took place on December 15, 2017, at the Hammerstein Ballroom in New York City, New York.

Storylines
Final Battle 2017 features professional wrestling matches, which involve different wrestlers from pre-existing scripted feuds, plots, and storylines. Wrestlers portray villains or heroes as they follow a series of events that build tension and culminate in a wrestling match or series of matches.

At War of the Worlds UK: Liverpool, ROH World Champion Cody defeated Sanada. After the match, he proclaimed that he had beaten everyone, but Dalton Castle interrupted. Cody avoided a confrontation and attacked Castle the next night, injuring Castle's shoulder. At Global Wars: Chicago, Cody was taking pictures with fans prior to his match, only for one of the fans to be a masked Castle. Castle later issued a challenge for Cody's championship, which was made official.

Event

Preliminary matches 
The event opened with Matt Taven, accompanied by Kingdom teammates T. K. O'Ryan and Vinny Marseglia, facing Will Ospreay. Taven performed the Climax on Ospreay after countering the OsCutter. for the win.

Next, War Machine faced The Addiction. War Machine performed the Fallout On Christopher Daniels, and Raymond Rowe made the cover to score the win.

After that, Jay Lethal faced off against Marty Scurll.In the end as Scurll attempted a chickenwing, Lethal attempted to hit Scurll with his own umbrella, but Scurll ducked and hit a European Uppercut on Lethal, knocking the umbrella out of his hand. As referee Todd Sinclair reached for the umbrella, Lethal low blowed Scurll and performed the Lethal Injection on Scrull to win the match.

Later, The Motor City Machine Guns (Chris Sabin and Alex Shelley) defended the ROH World Tag Team Championship against The Best Friends (Chuckie T. and Barretta). The Best Friends went for a double tag team move, after Chuckie performed on Sabin a piledriver, Chris Sabin was able to roll Beretta, the legal wrestler in the match, into a Jackknife, to retain the title.

Next, Kenny King defended the ROH World Television Championship in a Four-way elimination match against Punishment Martinez, Silas Young (accompanied by The Beer City Bruiser) and Shane Taylor. Taylor was the first to be eliminated. While Bruiser distracted the referee, Young hit King with a beer bottle to eliminate him as well. Young later performed the Misery on Martinez to win the championship.

Later, The Briscoes (Mark and Jay) faced Bully Ray and Tommy Dreamer in a New York Street Fight. Bully performed a plash on Jay through a table for a near fall. Dreamer gave him fluid as Ray attempted to light another table on fire. Mark hit him with an enzuigiri and the Briscoes performed "3B", their parody of the Dudley Boyz move 3D. As Jay held Bully down on the table, Mark performed the Froggy Bow on Ray through a table, and Jay pinned Ray to score the win.

Before the penultimate match, lead announcer Ian Riccaboni introduced the new Women of Honor Championship. Riccaboni announced that a tournament for the championship will start on January 20, 2018.

After that, The Hung Bucks defended the ROH World Six-Man Tag Team Championship against Dragon Lee, Flip Gordon and Titán. When Gordon attempted a springboard moonsault, all Hung Buck members superkicked him. They stacked Gordon and Dragon Lee on Page and hit a combination of the Indy Taker and Rite of Passage as Matt pinned Gordon to retain the title.

Main event 
Cody, accompanied by his wife Brandi Rhodes, defended the ROH World Championship against Dalton Castle, who was accompanied by The Boys. Castle performed the Bang-A-Rang on Cody to win the match and the title, giving Castle his first singles title in ROH.

Reception
Larry Csonka of 411Mania rated the show "average", calling the tag team title match "disappointing", the TV title match "bad" and the street fight "lethargic". Wade Keller of Pro Wrestling Torch called the main event "solid ... but not must-see or epic by any means", adding that it "didn't do anything to change the perception that Cody is good for a solid three-star-and-change type of match, but not much better".

Results

ROH World Television Championship match

See also
2017 in professional wrestling
List of Ring of Honor pay-per-view events

References

External links
Ring of Honor's official website

2017 in New York City
Events in New York City
2017
Professional wrestling in New York City
December 2017 events in the United States
2017 Ring of Honor pay-per-view events